Ghurki (Urdu:  گھرکی  ) is the name of a village on the outskirts of Lahore, Punjab. 

This village is named after the Ghurki Arain person who was notorious for being a big gold smuggler (Haji Muhammad Asghar Ghurki) along with his brothers Yousaf Ghurki and Younas Ghurki.

Haji Muhammad Asghar Ghurki was the founder of Ghurki Hospital. Muhammad Asghar Ghurki became the MNA in 1985 in partyless general elections. Khalid Javed Ghurki, son of Muhammad Asghar Ghurki belonging to a known political family of Lahore, Khalid was elected on the Pakistan People's Party's ticket in 1989. He was elected MNA in 1993 on the PPP ticket from Eastern Lahore and subsequently was made parliamentary secretary for railways. He also worked as Wagah Town nazim (mayor).

After developing medical complications a few years ago, Khalid Javed Ghurki died 0n 8 March 2011 due to renal failure. His wife, Samina Khalid Ghurki replaced him in the political arena and made it to the National Assembly of Pakistan in the 2008 general elections on PPP platform.

Samina Khalid Ghurki was re-elected in 2008 from the same constituency. She was appointed Federal Minister of Special Education in the cabinet of Prime Minister Yusuf Raza Gilani, Federal Minister of Environment and later Federal Minister of National Integration and Heritage in the cabinet of Prime Minister Raja Pervaiz Ashraf.

Ghurki village is located near the Wagah Border.

See also
 Arain

References

Wagha Town